Père David's mole (Talpa davidiana) is a mole found in the Middle East, ranging from south-central Turkey east to Kurdistan Province, Iran, although it could also range south into Syria. It is listed as a data deficient species. The species is named after the zoologist Armand David. As T. streeti, it is known as the Persian mole.

References

Mammals of the Middle East
Mammals of Turkey
Fauna of Iran
Fauna of Syria
EDGE species
Talpa
Mammals described in 1884